Sesselja (Hreindís) Sigmundsdóttir (5 July 1902 - 8 November 1974) was a noted Icelandic pioneer in the fields of pedagogy and the care for the mentally disabled and founder of the Sólheimar community.

After her training in education in Germany and Switzerland, where she was inspired by Rudolf Steiner, Sesselja returned to Iceland with the plan of establishing a self-sustaining community based on the anthroposophist philosophy. Here she would offer shelter and education to disabled and neglected children. At the age of 28, she acquire some land in a remote valley with its own hot spring and with the help of her family and friends built a farmhouse and named it Sólheimar - home of the sun.

The 2002 stamp 
She has been recognised with a postage stamp issued in 2002 by Íslandspóstur.  The stamp has a portrait of Sesselja and a picture of Sólheimar (Value 45 00 Scott 965).(An image of the stamp)

Sources 
Michaelsdóttir, Jónína (1990) “Mér leggst eitthvað til:Sagan um Sesselju Sigmundsdóttur og Sólheima” Relief fund of Sólheimar

References 

1902 births
1974 deaths
20th-century Icelandic people
People from Hafnarfjörður